Laurier Arthur Régnier (31 August 1903 – 8 August 1990) was a Progressive Conservative party member of the House of Commons of Canada. He was born in Saint-François-Xavier, Manitoba and became a barrister and farmer by career.

After unsuccessful attempts to win a House of Commons seat at Selkirk in the 1949 election, and at St. Boniface in 1957, Régnier won St. Boniface in the 1958 election. He served one term, the 24th Canadian Parliament, until his defeat there in the 1962 federal election.

Electoral history

External links
 

1903 births
1990 deaths
Members of the House of Commons of Canada from Manitoba
Progressive Conservative Party of Canada MPs
Canadian farmers
Lawyers in Manitoba
Franco-Manitoban people
20th-century Canadian lawyers